Queen's Mine is a village in Matabeleland North, Zimbabwe and is located about 55 km north-east of Bulawayo along the Bulawayo-Eastnor road. The village grew up around the now closed Queen's Mine. The gold mine was pegged on the site of ancient diggings in 1893. It derived its name from the nearby Ndebele queen's kraal.

Populated places in Matabeleland North Province